The following lists events that happened during 1903 in China.

Incumbents 
Guangxu Emperor (29th year)

examination
Zhuangyuan: Wang Shoupeng

Events

May 
Zhang Shizhao was hired as the chief editor of the Su Bao

July 
 July 1 - Shanghai Municipal Police transferred six people, including Zhang Binglin, to the public for review. (:zh:蘇報案)
 July 14 - the Dongqing Railway was opened to traffic.
 July 15 - the first public hearing. (:zh:蘇報案)
 July 21 - The second public hearing was held, but due to the Qing court was busy with extradition, so the plaintiff’s lawyer requested a rescheduling at the beginning of the trial. (:zh:蘇報案)

August 
 August 13 - Tsar Nicolas II appointed Alexeyev as viceroy in charge of all civil and military authority over Russian possessions in the Far East, including Russian-occupied Manchuria, the Liaodong Peninsula, and Russia Amur Military District (present day Primorsky Krai).

December 
 December 3 - The trial was officially held for a total of four days. (:zh:蘇報案)

Births 
 October 21 - K. C. Wu, a Chinese political figure and historian. 
 November 4 - Watchman Nee, a Chinese church leader and Christian teacher.
 December 28 – Tang Yunsheng, an opera singer in Peking.

 Gan Siqi
 Lu Kanru
 Hua Gang
 Li Shuoxun
 Chen Geng

Deaths 
 Zhu Shaowen
 April 11 - Ronglu was a Manchu political and military leader of the late Qing dynasty. (born in April 1836)
 Zhang Peilun

References